Elachista thelma is a moth of the family Elachistidae that is found in California.

The ground colour of the forewings is light brownish grey, dusted with darker tips of scales. The hindwings are grey and the underside of the wings is dark grey.

Etymology
The species name is an artificial combination of letters.

References

Moths described in 1997
thelma
Endemic fauna of California
Moths of North America
Fauna without expected TNC conservation status